Sögubrot af nokkrum fornkonungum (Fragment of a Saga about Certain Ancient Kings) is a fragmentary Icelandic text dealing with some legendary Swedish and Danish kings. It is thought to be based on the lost Skjöldunga saga and perhaps represents a late state of that work.

The fragment begins in the middle of the story of Ívarr inn víðfaðmi, '"Ivar the Widely Embracing", describing how he won the realm of Zealand through trickery, and how he committed suicide under strange circumstances while on an invasion of the realm of Ráðbarðr, who had married his daughter Auðr the Deep-Minded without his permission. The fragment then recounts the early life of Harald Wartooth but breaks off; it resumes with the arrival of Sigurd Hring, Harald's old age, and the colossal Battle of Brávellir. It breaks off again towards the end of Sigurd's life.

References

External links
The text in the original language
A rendering of Sögubrot in Swedish
The saga in English

Legendary sagas
Kings' sagas
Sources of Norse mythology